Amilna Estêvão is an Angolan fashion model.

Career
Estêvão was scouted in Angola by her mother agency Da Banda Model Management where she won Elite Model Look Angola 2013 . She became the first Black female finalist to reach the Top 3 position at the Elite Model Look competition 2013 edition. Afterwards, she signed with Elite Model Management and debuted in the F/W 2015 fashion week season notably walking for Prada, Fendi, Balenciaga, Alexander Wang, and Moschino. Later that year she walked for Prabal Gurung, Gucci, Kenzo, Burberry Prorsum, Givenchy, Alberta Ferretti, Lanvin, and Bottega Veneta among others.

References 

1999 births
Living people
People from Luanda
Angolan female models
The Society Management models
Elite Model Management models